Tharmada is a Saudi Arabian town, located about 170 kilometers north of the capital Riyadh.

Naming
The town is named after the plant Altharmad (Halexylon Salicornicum) which abounds in the region.

See also 

 List of cities and towns in Saudi Arabia
 Regions of Saudi Arabia

External links
 
 Google map of Tharmada'a
 

Populated places in Riyadh Province